Sir Robert James Charles  (born 14 March 1936) is a New Zealand professional golfer. His achievements over five decades rank him among the most successful left-handed golfers of all time, being the first lefty to win a major championship, winning more than 70 titles and beating his age twice during a tournament as a 71-year-old.

Although Charles plays golf left-handed, he is naturally right-handed.

Early years
Born in Carterton, a small town in the Wairarapa district in New Zealand's North Island, Charles lived in Masterton where he worked as a bank teller. He won the New Zealand Open at Heretaunga on 8 November 1954, as an 18-year-old amateur.

Charles decided to hone his skills as an amateur first, and remained in his bank employment for a further six years. He represented New Zealand several times in international amateur tournaments during this period.

Professional career
Charles turned professional in 1960 and the next year won the New Zealand PGA Championship and soon after ventured overseas to the European and North American circuits.

In 1963, Charles won his first PGA Tour event in the United States, the Houston Classic, the first PGA Tour event won by a left-handed golfer. Later that year he won The Open Championship at Royal Lytham and St. Annes. After four rounds (68-72-66-71) his 277 was level with American Phil Rodgers. Charles won the 36-hole playoff by eight shots.

Charles has won about 80 tournaments around the world. As well as his PGA Tour victories, his win in the 1969 World Matchplay Championship was considered one of his best. He won the Senior British Open 30 years after winning his British Open title. He remains, along with Michael Campbell, one of only two New Zealanders to win a men's major golf championship.

In 2007 Charles became the oldest golfer to make a cut on the European Tour at the Michael Hill New Zealand Open. Charles shot a 68 in the second round, beating his age by three strokes. He would go on to finish in a tie for 23rd place.

Charles's move to the Senior PGA Tour (now called PGA Tour Champions) was very lucrative and successful with 23 titles; and in three years 1988, 1989 and 1993, he recorded lowest scoring average. He finished second on the European Seniors Tour's 2007 Wentworth Senior Masters at the age of 71. He was the first left-hander to win a major, but also the first lefty to be inducted into the World Golf Hall of Fame, in the veterans category. He was inducted in 2008. He would remain the only lefty inducted into the World Golf Hall of Fame until Phil Mickelson was elected in 2011.

At the Senior British Open Championship in 2010, Charles announced in an ESPN interview that he would retire from golf, stating that he was "74 years old, traveling this world for 50 years, and it's time to slow down and spend more time on my farm in New Zealand with my family."

Personal life
In the 1971 Queen's Birthday Honours, Charles was appointed an Officer of the Order of the British Empire, for services to sport. In the 1992 New Year Honours, he was promoted to Commander of the Order of the British Empire, for services to golf. In the 1999 New Year Honours, Charles was appointed a Knight Companion of the New Zealand Order of Merit, for services to golf. In the 2011 New Year Honours 2011, Charles was appointed as a Member of the Order of New Zealand, New Zealand's highest civilian honour, for services to New Zealand.

In December 1962, Charles married Verity Joan Aldridge in Johannesburg, South Africa. They met three years previously at the Commonwealth Golf tournament when it was held in South Africa. The golfers Denis Hutchinson and Bobby Verwey served as groomsmen. They had two children, Beverly and David. David is a golf director in the United States. He is a successful golf course designer having had major input into the Formosa Country Club east of Auckland, Millbrook at the resort town of Queenstown, and The Dunes course at Matarangi on the Coromandel Peninsula. He was also consultant to the Clearwater course, near Christchurch, designed by golf architect John Darby.

Charles has played in the Gary Player Invitational several times to assist Gary Player raise funds for various underprivileged children's causes.

Professional wins (80)

PGA Tour wins (6)

PGA Tour playoff record (1–2)

European Tour wins (4)

European Tour playoff record (0–1)

Sunshine Tour wins (1)

PGA Tour of Australasia wins (5)

*Note: The 1973 City of Auckland Classic was shortened to 54 holes due to rain.

PGA Tour of Australasia playoff record (0–2)

Tournament Players Series wins (1)

Tournament Players Series playoff record (1–0)

European circuit wins (6) 
 1961 Bowmaker Tournament
 1962 Swiss Open, Daks Tournament (tie with Dai Rees), Engadine Open
1963 Open Championship
 1969 Piccadilly World Match Play Championship

New Zealand circuit wins (19)
1954 New Zealand Open (as an amateur)
1961 New Zealand PGA Championship, Caltex Tournament
1962 Caltex Tournament
1963 Wattie's Tournament
1966 New Zealand Open, Wattie's Tournament, Metalcraft Tournament, Forest Products Tournament (tie with Tony Jacklin)
1967 New Zealand Wills Masters (tie with Martin Roesink), Caltex Tournament (tie with Peter Thomson), Wattie's Tournament
1968 Wattie's Tournament, Caltex Tournament
1969 Spalding Masters
1970 New Zealand Open
1971 Otago Charity Classic, Caltex Tournament
1972 Spalding Masters

Other wins (1)

Senior PGA Tour wins (25)

*Note: The 1988 Pepsi Senior Challenge was shortened to 36 holes due to rain.

Senior PGA Tour playoff record (2–8)

European Senior Tour wins (1)

European Senior Tour playoff record (0–1)

Other senior wins (13)
1986 Mazda Champions (with Amy Alcott)
1987 Mauna Lani Invitational
1988 Fuji Electric Grandslam, 1st National Bank Classic
1989 Fuji Electric Grandslam
1990 Fuji Electric Grandslam, Kintetsu Home Senior, Daikyo Senior Invitational
1991 Kintetsu Home Senior
1998 Office Depot Father/Son Challenge (with son David)
2004 Liberty Mutual Legends of Golf – Raphael Division (with Stewart Ginn)
2009 Liberty Mutual Legends of Golf – Demaret Division (with Gary Player)
2010 Liberty Mutual Legends of Golf – Demaret Division (with Gary Player)

Major championships

Wins (1)

1Defeated Phil Rodgers in a 36-hole playoff (Charles 69-71=140, Rodgers 72-76=148).

Results timeline
Amateur

Professional

CUT = missed the halfway cut (3rd round cut in 1976 Open Championship)
WD = withdrew
QF, SF = Round in which player lost in match play
"T" indicates a tie for a place.

Source for The Masters: www.masters.com

Source for U.S. Open: USGA Championship Database

Source for The British Open: www.opengolf.com

Source for PGA Championship: PGA Championship Media Guide

Source for 1958 Amateur Championship: The Glasgow Herald, 6 June 1958, p. 4.

Summary

Most consecutive cuts made – 11 (1962 Masters – 1965 Masters)
Longest streak of top-10s – 3 (1968 U.S. Open – 1968 PGA)

Senior major championships

Wins (2)

Team appearances
Amateur
Eisenhower Trophy (representing New Zealand): 1958, 1960
Commonwealth Tournament (representing New Zealand): 1959
Sloan Morpeth Trophy (representing New Zealand): 1956

Professional
World Cup (representing New Zealand): 1962, 1963, 1964, 1965, 1966, 1967, 1968, 1971, 1972
Hennessy Cognac Cup (representing the Rest of the World): 1982
Dunhill Cup (representing New Zealand): 1985, 1986

See also
List of golfers with most Champions Tour wins
List of men's major championships winning golfers

References

External links

New Zealand male golfers
PGA Tour of Australasia golfers
PGA Tour golfers
European Tour golfers
PGA Tour Champions golfers
Winners of men's major golf championships
Winners of senior major golf championships
World Golf Hall of Fame inductees
New Zealand Commanders of the Order of the British Empire
Knights Companion of the New Zealand Order of Merit
Members of the Order of New Zealand
Left-handed golfers
People in sports awarded knighthoods
People educated at Wairarapa College
People from Carterton, New Zealand
Sportspeople from Masterton
People from Oxford, New Zealand
1936 births
Living people